The Pratomagno is a mountain range, which has the Arno River on both sides: to the west is the upper Valdarno and to the east is the Casentino. It lies north-west of the city of Arezzo, in Tuscany, Italy.

Its highest peak has an elevation of 1,592 m.

References 

Mountain ranges of Italy
Apennine Mountains
Mountains of Tuscany
Metropolitan City of Florence
Province of Arezzo
Geographical, historical and cultural regions of Italy